Werner Pittschau (24 March 1902 – 28 October 1928) was a German theater and film actor of the silent film era. He was a leading men in 30 films during the 1920s, but his career was cut short by his death in an automobile accident, aged 26.

Pittschau was the son of the German theater actor Ernst Pittschau Sr. (1859-1916) and the Viennese theatre and film actress Hilda Hofer-Pittschau née Schützenhofer (1873-1961). He began his career after training in 1919 as an actor at the Deutsches Landestheater in Prague. His older half-brother was actor Ernst Pittschau (1883-1951).

On Sunday, 28 October 1928, Werner Pittschau and his girlfriend, dancer Wilma Harmening, were driving from Berlin to Mecklenburg when Pittschau lost control of the vehicle and collided into a tree near the village of Gerdshagen. The vehicle overturned several times. When the accident was discovered, Pittschau was already deceased. Harmening died at the scene shortly after help arrived. Both Pittschau and Harmening were buried at the Friedhof Heerstraße cemetery in Berlin. However, their graves have not been preserved.

Selected filmography
 Women of Luxury (1925)
 The Hanseatics (1925)
 Anne-Liese of Dessau (1925)
 The Iron Bride (1925)
 People in Need (1925)
 The Pride of the Company (1926)
 The Wiskottens (1926)
 The Clever Fox (1926)
 Wrath of the Seas (1926)
 Vienna, How it Cries and Laughs (1926)
 The Eleven Schill Officers (1926)
 Der Balletterzherzog aka Virtue (1926)
 The Last Horse Carriage in Berlin (1926)
 Sacco und Vanzetti (1927)
 Tragedy of the Street (1927)
 A Murderous Girl (1927)
 Tragedy at the Royal Circus (1928)
 Kaiserjäger (1928)
 The White Sonata (1928)
 Archduke John (1929, posthumous release)
 Street Acquaintances (1929, posthumous release)

References

External links

1902 births
1928 deaths
German male film actors
German male silent film actors
Male actors from Berlin
20th-century German male actors
Road incident deaths in Germany